Adrián Bireš (born 18 May 1969) is a Slovak alpine skier. He competed in five events at the 1988 Winter Olympics as part of the Czechoslovakian olympic delegation.

References

1969 births
Living people
Slovak male alpine skiers
Olympic alpine skiers of Czechoslovakia
Alpine skiers at the 1988 Winter Olympics
Sportspeople from Banská Bystrica